The British Rail Class 202 (or 6L) diesel-electric multiple units were built from 1957-58 at Eastleigh and Ashford Works. These units were built to work the London Charing Cross to Hastings services. Several tunnels along the route had restricted clearance, meaning that these units were built with a narrow body profile. Similar to the Class 201 (or 6S) they were built to the longer (63ft 5in) BR Mk1 standard and therefore had 288 seats (240 second class plus 48 first class) compared to the 242 (200+42) of the 6S units.

The last six-car units were withdrawn in 1986, when the Hastings line was electrified. The line through the tunnels was reduced to single track, allowing standard loading gauge Class 411 electrical multiple units to replace the diesel units on passenger services. One unit was subsequently reinstated to provide emergency cover, and was renumbered as 202001 to conform with the TOPS numbering system.

After the mass withdrawals of 1986, several units were reformed as four-car units, and subsequently renumbered into the Class 203 series. In addition, several vehicles saw further use as departmental vehicles.

 Introduced: 1957-58

Fleet details

Original 6L Units

Reformed 4L Units

Departmental Units

Preservation

One complete unit has been preserved.
1013 – by Hastings Diesels
Two vehicles from unit 1012 have also been preserved.
1012 – DMBSO 60016 and TFK 60708 - by Hastings Diesels

Several of the vehicles from 1012 and 1013 now operate in preserved mainline registered unit 201001. To avoid conflict with Class 60 locomotives, motor vehicles 60016 and 60018 have been renumbered to 60116 and 60118 respectively. These two vehicles have also been named after towns along the routes which they previously worked.
60116 (ex-60016) – Mountfield
60118 (ex-60018) – Tunbridge Wells

See also
British Rail Classes 201, 202 and 203

References

Further reading

External links
 Hastings Diesels

202
Diesel electric multiple units
Train-related introductions in 1957